Asbestos-ceramic is a type of pottery manufactured with asbestos and clay in Finland, Karelia and more widely in Fennoscandia from around 5000 BC. Some remnants of this style of pottery lasted until as late as 200 AD. These ceramics are able to retain heat longer than other pottery.

Occasionally other kinds of pottery that do not contain any asbestos, but do have good insulating properties, are (mistakenly) called "asbestos-ceramic". However, some such pottery, called hair-thermal pottery, is found with similar shape and decoration, dating from the same period as some of the genuine asbestos-containing ceramics, and is discussed below.

Origin and distribution
Around 3600 BC, when typical comb ware ceramics were replaced by late comb ware ceramics, the practice of mixing asbestos into pottery clay emerged in eastern Finland and the Karelian regions near Lake Ladoga, and also along the Neva River. 

The most probable origin of this style of ware is the shores of Lake Saimaa in Finland. Finds from inland Finland are the oldest, and the Lake Saimaa area is the only location in the region with plentiful, nearby, easily accessible natural deposits of asbestos.

Some scholars argue that these pottery traditions were influenced from the Upper Volga and the Oka regions.

Asbestos-ceramic of Lovozero ware type is also found in Fennoscandia, on Bolshoy Oleny Island in the Murmansk region of Russia. Furthermore, a later type of asbestos-laden ware was also found here, known in the Russian archaeological literature as ‘waffe’ ware. In Norwegian and Finnish literature, the usual term for similar impressions on pottery are ‘textile’ or ‘imitated textile’.

Categories of asbestos ceramics
Asbestos ceramics are usually classified as a sub-type of comb ceramic ware.

From the times of the earliest comb ware in Finland, asbestos was mixed with clay as an adhesive. At some point, people started to make use of the characteristics of asbestos: Its long fibres allowed large vessels with thin walls, which made them lighter, without compromising durability. Some of the vessels had walls 6 mm thick with a diameter of around 50 cm (Pöljä-style).

The Finnish researchers divide asbestos ceramics into the following styles:

Early asbestos ware
Pit-comb ware with asbestos
Kaunissaari ware
Sperrings ware

Main-period styles
Pöljä ware
Kierikki ware

Late asbestos ware
Jysmä ware

Kaunissaari ware was an early asbestos-tempered ware. Its distribution is centred on the eastern lake area of Finland. Sperrings ware was another type of early asbestos-tempered ware from about the same time.

The style seems to disappear around 200 AD in Finland but continues in Scandinavia. The disappearance is thought to be related to the transition to a semi-nomadic reindeer husbandry lifestyle.

Asbestos-containing variants
There are two variants of asbestos-containing pottery. The name depends on the proportion asbestos: Ceramics with an asbestos amount of 50–60% are called asbestos pottery; vessels containing 90% asbestos and 10% clay are asbestos ware.

Asbestos pottery
Asbestos pottery (50–60% asbestos, 50–40% clay) is usually found along with evidence suggesting metal work, i.e. crucibles, moulds, slag, fused clay, artefacts of bronze and copper, and stone sledge hammers. Asbestos ceramic may also have been used as a heat-storage medium.

Some of the Fenno-Scandinavian vessel patterns are identical to the Neolithic and Bronze Age Jōmon culture in Japan (jōmon = rope pattern). However, the most common patterns are the comb and pit decorations typical of North-Eastern Europe at the time (Finland).

Asbestos ware
Asbestos ware (90% asbestos, 10% clay) is unusually heat-tolerant: It can survive temperatures up to 900–1000 °C. The clay is used to make shaping the vessel possible, but with such a low proportion of clay, it is technically not pottery.

It is believed that the asbestos ware was used in iron production such as spearheads, arrowheads and artefacts. Found vessels were drilled with many holes. The fact that the reduction of iron ore (FeO3) with abundant carbon generates large amounts of carbon monoxide (CO) may suggest that the drilled holes were used to improve the availability of air (oxygen) to maintain an adequately intense flame for the high temperatures required for the iron smelting. Iron ore is abundant in lakes e.g. in Finland.

Clay with hair added
Lastly, the term hair-temperature pottery refers to ceramics made of fine, sorted clay, augmented with about 30% finely cut hair and chamotte. It generally contains no asbestos (some samples have insignificant traces).
These ceramics were made with similar shape, size, and surface treatment (including decoration) as the asbestos pottery.

Hair, when used as ceramic additive, burns away during firing, leaving characteristic thin pores in the resulting pottery.
The hair-thermal ceramics' intended use is unknown, but tests of its heat-retaining (insulating) capacity suggests it was intended for some kind of use requiring insulation. However, unlike asbestos, mixing hair into clay does not improve the durability or heat resistance of the resulting ceramic.

Notes

References

Sources
 

Archaeological cultures of Northern Europe
Ancient pottery